Centrair may refer to:

 Chūbu Centrair International Airport, an international airport in Japan (with the term Centrair meaning Central Japan), or
 Centrair (France), an aviation manufacturer of France